Jewels 16th Ring was a mixed martial arts (MMA) event held by Jewels at Shin-Kiba 1st Ring in Koto, Tokyo, Japan on .

The event featured the first round of the Jewels Featherweight Queen tournament, which determined the first featherweight (-48 kg) titleholder of the promotion.

Background
At the end of Jewels 15th Ring, it was announced that Jewels 16th Ring would hold the first round of the Jewels Featherweight Queen Grand Prix; a tournament that will crown the first featherweight queen (champion) of the promotion. Naho Sugiyama, Yasuko Tamada, Misaki Takimoto, Sachiko Yamamoto, Kikuyo Ishikawa, Yukiko Seki, Miyoko Kusaka and Ayumi Saito were revealed as the participants in the tournament.

On , six bouts were announced for the card. Naho Sugiyama vs. Ayumi Saito, Yasuko Tamada vs. Kikuyo Ishikawa, Misaki Takimoto vs. Miyoko Kusaka and Yukiko Seki vs. Sachiko Yamamoto would be the quarterfinals in the Jewels Featherweight GP. Rina Tomita, competing for the first time since undergoing surgery six months earlier, would face Anna Saito in a regular MMA match, and Chikako WSR would face Satoko Ozawa in a kickboxing match.

Two other matches, Emi Tomimatsu vs. Celine Haga and Yuko Oya vs. Akiko Naito were also added to the card.

Three more undercard amateur matches were announced a day before the event. Saya Ito vs. Ryouka and Mili Sasaki vs. Chihiro Imoto would compete as part of the Jewels Under-15 Kickboxing mini-tournament and Tamaki Usui vs. Nana Ichikawa would fight under amateur MMA rules.

The day before the event, all fighters made weight on their first attempt during the weigh-ins.

Event
Saya Ito and Chihiro Imoto won their semi-final matches in the Jewels Under-15 amateur kickboxing tournament.

Naho Sugiyama, Kikuyo Ishikawa, Misaki Takimoto and Yukiko Seki were victorious in quarterfinal matches in the Jewels Featherweight Queen tournament. A drawing was held after the event to determine semi-final matchups. Sugiyama faced Ishikawa, while Takimoto faced Seki. The semi-final and final will take place at Jewels 17th Ring.

In the main event, Ayaka Hamasaki defeated Mizuki Inoue via unanimous decision.

Results

Opening card
1st opening fight: Jewels amateur rules -48 kg, 4:00 x 1 round
 Tamaki Usui (Reversal Gym Tokyo Standout) vs.  Nana Ichikawa (freelance)
Usui defeated Ichikawa by submission (armbar) at 2:01 of round 1.

2nd opening fight: Jewels U-15 Kickboxing Tournament semi-final, Jewels amateur kickboxing rules -46 kg, 2:00 x 2 rounds
 Chihiro Imoto (Kokushi Gym) vs.  Mili Sasaki (Shobukai)
Imoto defeated Sasaki by decision (3-0).

3rd opening fight: Jewels U-15 Kickboxing Tournament semi-final, Jewels amateur kickboxing rules -46 kg, 2:00 x 2 rounds
 Ryoka Yasuoka (T.B. Nation) vs.  Saya Ito (Shobukai)
Ito defeated Yasuoka by decision (3-0).

Main card
1st match: Jewels official rules -54 kg bout, 5:00 x 2 rounds
 Rina Tomita (AACC) vs.  Anna Saito (Fight Chix)
Tomita defeated Saito by technical submission (referee stoppage, armbar) at 4:24 of round 1.

2nd match: Jewels official rules lightweight bout, 5:00 x 2 rounds
 Akiko Naito (Deep Official Gym Impact) vs.  Yuko Oya (Wajutsu Keishukai RJW)
Oya defeated Naito by decision (2-1).

3rd match: Jewels official rules lightweight bout, 5:00 x 2 rounds
 Celine Haga (Team Hellboy Hansen, Jewels) vs.  Emi Tomimatsu (Paraestra Matsudo)
Tomimatsu defeated Haga by decision (3-0).

4th match: Jewels kickboxing rules -58 kg bout, 2:00 x 3 rounds
 Chikako WSR (WSR Fairtex) vs.  Satoko Ozawa (Team Dragon)
Ozawa defeated Chikako WSR by decision (2-0).

5th match: Jewels Featherweight Queen GP 2011 first round, Jewels official rules, 5:00 x 2 rounds
 Yukiko Seki (Fight Chix) vs.  Sachiko Yamamoto (Angura)
Seki defeated Yamamoto by decision (3-0).

6th match: Jewels Featherweight Queen GP 2011 first round, Jewels official rules, 5:00 x 2 rounds
 Misaki Takimoto (Zendokai Yokohama) vs.  Miyoko Kusaka (Grabaka Gym)
Takimoto defeated Kusaka by decision (3-0).

7th match: Jewels Featherweight Queen GP 2011 first round, Jewels official rules, 5:00 x 2 rounds
 Yasuko Tamada (AACC) vs.  Kikuyo Ishikawa (Reversal Gym Yokohama Groundslam)
Ishikawa defeated Tamada by decision (3-0).

8th match: Jewels Featherweight Queen GP 2011 first round, Jewels official rules, 5:00 x 2 rounds
 Naho Sugiyama (Wajutsu Keishukai Akza) vs.  Ayumi Saito (Angura)
Sugiyama defeated Saito by decision (3-0).

9th match: Jewels kickboxing rules -57.15 kg bout, 3:00 x 3 rounds
 Kozue Nagashima (y-park) vs.  Kim Sung Eun (Kokusai Muay Thai Gym)
Nagashima defeated Kim by KO (knee to the body) at 0:34 of round 2.

10th match: Jewels official rules -54 kg bout, 5:00 x 2 rounds
 Ayaka Hamasaki (AACC) vs.  Mizuki Inoue (White Heart Karate Association)
Hamasaki defeated Inoue by decision (3-0).

References

External links
Official results at Jewels official blog 
Event results at Sherdog
Event results at God Bless the Ring 
Event results at Bout Review 

Jewels (mixed martial arts) events
2011 in mixed martial arts
Mixed martial arts in Japan
Sports competitions in Tokyo
2011 in Japanese sport